Steven Ako van der Sloot (born 6 July 2002) is a Dutch professional footballer who plays as a defender for German club Schalke 04 II.

International career
Van der Sloot was born in Cameroon to a Dutch father and a Cameroonian mother, and holds dual citizenship. He was a youth international for the Netherlands.

Career statistics

Honours
Netherlands U17
UEFA European Under-17 Championship: 2019

References

2002 births
Cameroonian people of Dutch descent
Dutch people of Cameroonian descent
Living people
People from Southwest Region (Cameroon)
Cameroonian footballers
Dutch footballers
Netherlands youth international footballers
Association football defenders
Haaglandia players
ADO Den Haag players
Feyenoord players
AFC Ajax players
Jong Ajax players
FC Schalke 04 II players
Eerste Divisie players
Regionalliga players
Dutch expatriate footballers
Expatriate footballers in Germany
Dutch expatriate sportspeople in Germany
Cameroonian expatriate footballers
Cameroonian expatriate sportspeople in Germany
Footballers from South Holland